The 2020 Arkansas Senate elections took place as part of the biennial 2020 United States elections. Arkansas voters elected state senators to the Arkansas Senate in 17 of the state's 35 senate districts. The primary elections on March 3, 2020, determined which candidates would appear on the November 3, 2020, general election ballot.

The outcome of this election was identified by the National Conference of State Legislatures as one of many that could affect partisan balance during post-Census redistricting.

Following the previous election in 2018, Republicans, led by Bart Hester (AR-01), had control of the Arkansas Senate with 26 seats to Democrats, led by Keith Ingram (AR-24), with 9 seats. In the 2020 cycle, Republicans made a net gain of two seats, defeating two incumbent Democratic senators, bringing the partisan balance to a 28-7 supermajority.

Composition

Predictions

Summary

Closest races 
Seats where the margin of victory was under 10%:

Detailed results

District 1

District 2

District 7

District 11

District 12

District 13

District 16

District 21

District 22

District 23

District 25

District 26

District 27

District 28

District 29

District 32

District 34

See also
 2020 Arkansas elections
 2020 Arkansas House of Representatives election
 Arkansas Senate

References

External links
 
 
  (State affiliate of the U.S. League of Women Voters)
 

Senate
Arkansas Senate
Arkansas Senate elections